Heather Young is a Canadian filmmaker based in Dartmouth, Nova Scotia.

Biography
Originally from Saint John, New Brunswick, Young is a graduate of the University of New Brunswick and Nova Scotia College of Art and Design (NSCAD).

Her thesis film Dog Girl won the Norman McLaren Award for Best Student Film at the Montreal World Film Festival. Her other short films include Green (2013) and Howard and Jean (2014). Her short Fish received an Honourable Mention for Best Canadian Short at the Vancouver International Film Festival and played at TIFF Canada's Top Ten in 2017. Her short Milk won Best Short Film in the Focus Québec/Canada competition at Festival du nouveau cinéma and also played at TIFF Canada's Top Ten in 2018.

Her feature film debut, Murmur, premiered at the 2019 Toronto International Film Festival, where it won the FIPRESCI Discovery Prize. In December 2019, it was named to TIFF's annual year-end Canada's Top Ten list of the year's best Canadian films. It also won the John Dunning Award for Best First Feature at the Canadian Screen Awards.

Filmography
 Dog Girl (short, 2009)
 A Night Out (short, 2011)
 Green (short, 2013)
 Howard and Jean (short, 2014)
 Fish (short, 2016), winner of the Screen Nova Scotia short film award
 Milk (short, 2017) about a pregnant woman working on a dairy farm
 Murmur (feature film, 2019)

Accolades
 Montreal World Film Festival: Norman McLaren Award for best overall student film (Dog Girl, 2009)
 SilverWave Award for Best Canadian Short film (A Night Out, 2011)
 Canada's Top Ten shorts of 2016 (Fish)

References

Living people
Canadian women film directors
Film directors from New Brunswick
Film directors from Nova Scotia
People from Dartmouth, Nova Scotia
People from Saint John, New Brunswick
University of New Brunswick alumni
NSCAD University alumni
Year of birth missing (living people)